Toomja is a village, situated in the region Raplamaa near Rapla Parish, in northwestern Estonia. Between 1993 and 2017 (until the administrative reform of Estonian municipalities), the village was located in Kaiu Parish.

References

Villages in Rapla County